El Carmen is a department of Jujuy Province (Argentina).

References

External links

Departments of Jujuy Province